Exile Tribe (Japanese: エグザイル・トライブ, stylized as EXILE TRIBE) is the name given to the collective of artists under LDH which are related to the agency's main group, Exile. In 2012, these artists formed a supergroup together, including all members of Exile, Exile The Second, Sandaime J Soul Brothers, Generations, The Rampage, Fantastics, Ballistik Boyz and Gekidan Exile. This concept was first explored in 2004 with the creation of EXILES.

Their single "The Revolution" was the 9th best-selling single of 2014 in Japan and their album Exile Tribe Revolution was the 8th best-selling album of 2014 in Japan.

History 
The term EXILE TRIBE was first used on the tour Nidaime J Soul Brothers VS Sandaime J Soul Brothers LIVE TOUR 2011 ~EXILE TRIBE~ in June 2011. One year later, in April 2012, the EXILE TRIBE LIVE TOUR 2012 ~TOWER OF WISH~ concert tour was held featuring various LDH artists.

In September 2012, a unit featuring EXILE and Sandaime J Soul Brothers released the single "24karats TRIBE OF GOLD" as EXILE TRIBE.

In January 2013, Sandaime J Soul Brothers and GENERATIONS added the brand EXILE TRIBE in its group name. On September 10, 2013, both groups released the joint single "BURNING UP!", credited as a release from EXILE TRIBE.

In January 2014, LDH started the EXILE TRIBE PERFECT YEAR 2014, with releases from EXILE TRIBE and its connected groups and a nationwide dome tour.

On April 11, 2014, the group THE RAMPAGE was announced as part of EXILE TRIBE.

On September 20, EXILE TRIBE released a single titled "THE REVOLUTION", including members from groups EXILE, Sandaime J Soul Brothers, and GENERATIONS in its line-up. A week later, the same line-up released the album EXILE TRIBE REVOLUTION. Both the single and the album reached the #1 position on Oricon's weekly chart. From September to December, all groups related to EXILE TRIBE participated in the dome tour EXILE TRIBE PERFECT YEAR LIVE TOUR TOWER OF WISH 2014 ~THE REVOLUTION~.

On October 22, 2015, members part of the EXILE TRIBE starred in the TV drama HiGH&LOW ~THE STORY OF S.W.O.R.D.~. The groups also participated in the soundtrack of the drama, which was released in 2016 as part of EXILE TRIBE's releases. They continued to participate in the project until 2017.

On January 25, 2017, THE RAMPAGE made their major debut with the single "Lightning", officially joining the EXILE TRIBE.

On September 15, 2018, FANTASTICS was announced as an EXILE TRIBE group and officially joined on December 5 after their major debut with the single "OVER DRIVE".

On March 31, 2019, BALLISTIK BOYZ was announced as an EXILE TRIBE group, officially joining on May 22 with the release of their major debut album.

In June 2019, the Battle of Tokyo project started, which introduced a new unit of EXILE TRIBE called Jr.EXILE. This unit consists of the groups Generations, The Rampage, Fantastics, and Ballistik Boyz.

Band members 

 Exile
 Exile The Second
 Sandaime J Soul Brothers
 Gekidan Exile
 Generations from Exile Tribe
 The Rampage from Exile Tribe
 Fantastics from Exile Tribe
 Ballistik Boyz from Exile Tribe
 Psychic Fever from Exile Tribe
Lil League from Exile Tribe
 Samurize from Exile Tribe

Discography

Studio albums

Remix albums

Singles

Promotional singles

Video albums

Notes

References

External links
 

2011 establishments in Japan
Avex Group artists
Japanese pop music groups
Musical groups established in 2011
Musical groups from Tokyo
Supergroups (music)
Japanese boy bands
LDH (company) artists